Pseudacraea peyrierasi is a butterfly in the family Nymphalidae. It is found on Madagascar. The habitat consists of forests.

References

Butterflies described in 1991
Limenitidinae